The Leech (also known as A Woman's Youth) is a 1956 Egyptian drama film directed by Salah Abu Seif. It was entered into the 1956 Cannes Film Festival.

Synopsis
The film revolves around Imam Biltagy Hassanein Shoukry Sarhan), a young man who comes from the countryside to study in Cairo. In the Al-Khalifa neighboorhood, he rents a house from a woman named Shafaat (Taheyya Kariokka). Seduced by her, he indulges in vice and falls behind on his studies. On the other hand, a young woman close to him who has known him since childhood helps out of the spiral. The latter woman’s father advises Biltagy to stay away from her, so he fights to break out of Shafaat’s clutches.

Cast
 Taheyya Kariokka (Shafaat)
 Shoukry Sarhan (Imam Biltagy Hussein)
 Shadia (Salwa)
 Abdel Warress Asser (Uncle Hasbo)
 Seraj Munir (Ismail al-Sharnouby
 Ferdoos Mohammed (Imam's mother)
 Mary Ezz el-Din (Mrs. Sharnouby)
 Soleiman el-Gendy (Fathi)
 Abbas el-Daly
 Abdel Moneim Bassioni (police officer)

References

External links

 El Cinema page
 Kinopoisk page
 archived El Film page
 Rotten Tomatoes page
 AlloCiné page
 FilmAffinity page
 Letterboxd page

1956 films
1950s Arabic-language films
1956 drama films
Egyptian black-and-white films
Films directed by Salah Abu Seif
Egyptian drama films